Alexander Alexandrovich Kornilov (30 November 1862 – 26 April 1925) was a Russian historian and liberal politician.

Biography

Prior to the Russian Revolution of 1917, Kornilov was a history professor at the Polytechnicum of Peter the Great in Saint Petersburg and author of a definitive history of 19th century Russia. He specialized in the reign of Alexander II of Russia and the life of Mikhail Bakunin. In 1917, he served as secretary of the Central Committee of the liberal Constitutional Democratic Party and chairman of the party's Petrograd Committee.

After the Russian Civil War (1918–1920) Kornilov taught at the renamed Polytechnical Institute in Petrograd and continued his work on Bakunin.

Works

In English
Modern Russian History: Being an authoritative and detailed history of Russia from the Age of Catherine the Great to the Present, in 2 volumes, 679pp, trans. by Alexander S. Kaun, New York, Knopf, 1917. Reprinted as:
Modern Russian History: from the Age of Catherine the Great to the End of the 19th Century, Knopf, 1943, 1951, 1952, 1970
19th Century Russia: From the Age of Napoleon to the Eve of Revolution, edited and abridged by Robert Bass, New York, Capricorn Books, 1966, 428pp

In Russian
Krest'anskaya reforma. Saint Petersburg, Tipo-lit. F. Vaijsberga i P. Gershunina, 1905, 271p
Krest'anskij stroj, 1905
Ocherki po istorii obshchestvennago dvizheniya i krestyanskago dela v Rossii, Saint Petersburg, 1905, 473pp
Obshchestvennoe dvizheniie pri Aleksandre II, 1855-1881: istoricheskie ocherki, Moscow, [Izd. zhurnala "Russkaya mysl'"], 1909, 263pp
Molodye gody Mikhaila Bakunina: iz istorīi russkago romantizma, Moscow, Izd. M. i S. Sabashnikovykh, 1915, 718p
Russkaya politika v Pol'she so vremeni razdelov do nachala XX veka: istoricheskij ocherk, Petrogad, Ogni, 1915, 93p
Semejstvo Bakuninykh, [Moscow, Izd. M. i S. Sabashnikovykh, 1915], 2 volumes
Kurs istorii Rossii devytnadtsatogo weka, in 3 volumes, 1918, reprinted in 1969
Gody stranstvij Mikhaila Bakunina, Leningrad, Gos. izd-vo, 1925, 590p

References
Critical Companion to the Russian Revolution 1914-1921, eds. Edward Acton, Vladimir Iu. Cherniaev, William G. Rosenberg, Indiana University Press, 1997, p. 754, 

1862 births
1925 deaths
20th-century Russian historians
Politicians of the Russian Empire
Russian Constitutional Democratic Party members